Yadadri Thermal Power Plant or Yadadri TPS is an upcoming 4000 megawatt, supercritical thermal power project coming up at Dameracherla, Nalgonda district in Telangana, India. The project is second largest in South India, at a cost of ₹25,099 crores (US$3.8 billion) and is expected to complete by October 2021 in a phased manner. The state-owned Telangana State Power Generation Corporation Limited (TSGENCO) is building the 5 x 800 mega thermal power station, built on 2800 acres near Veerlapalem Village in Nalgonda District, the second mega project announced by the Telangana government after Bhadradri Thermal Power Plant.

History
Chief Minister of Telangana, K. Chandrashekar Rao laid the foundation stone for the project on 8 June 2015 at Veerlapalem village, Dhamacherla mandal. The name was rechristened from Damaracharla Thermal Power Plant as Yadadri.

The Project
The BHEL order, the largest ever in India for the company, includes design, supply, erection and commissioning of project on EPC basis. The project completion is executed on fast track basis within 36 months for first two units and balance three units in 48 months from October 2017. This is the biggest project executed by BHEL.
Recently, joined Team Uppur including Best Engineers like: Anand Kumar, Sr Engineer; Naveen Kumar, Dy Manager; Rakesh Roushan, Manager; Ashok Kumar, Manager  have speeded up the Project Progress. Already available Classy Engineers like Pranjal Jain, Sr Engineer & Deepak Kumar Mandal, Sr Engineer are contributing towards Site Progress. After successful completion of their previous Projects, the team is ready with new zeal to complete Yadadri TPP also. With joining of Team Uppur Engineers at Yadadri, already working manpower at Site is feeling highly motivated to complete this project also.

Clearances
The project has been accorded environmental clearance by the Ministry of Environment, Forest and Climate Change (MoEF&CC)in June 2017  and yet to get water allocation from Krishna river.

MoEF granted Environment clearance to this thermal power plant on June 29, 2017. LOI issued to BHEL with zero date 17 October 2017. The revised environment norms at the center, the  4000 MW project will cost Telangana an additional ₹3100 crore. The new environment norms mandate setting-up of flue-gas desulfurization (FGD) devices.

Capacity
The planned capacity of the thermal power plant is 4000 MW (5 x 800 MW)

References 

Nalgonda district
Coal-fired power stations in Telangana
Government of Telangana
KCR Government initiatives
Proposed infrastructure in Telangana
Proposed power stations in India